Minister for Water is a position in the government of Western Australia, currently held by Dave Kelly of the Labor Party. The position was first created in 1913, for the government of John Scaddan, and has existed in almost every government since then. The minister is responsible for the state government's Department of Water, which manage water resources in Western Australia. Until the 1930s, the responsibilities now held by the Minister for Water were often shared by two ministers, each with a different title.

Titles
 16 January 1913 – 27 July 1916 (two ministers): Minister for Water Supply and Minister for Sewerage and Drainage
 27 July 1916 – 28 June 1917: Minister for Water Supply
 28 June 1917 – 15 April 1924 (two ministers): Minister for Water Supply and Minister for Sewerage and Drainage
 15 April 1924 – 15 December 1927: Minister for Water Supply
 15 December 1927 – 23 April 1930 (two ministers): Minister for Metropolitan Water Supply and Minister for Goldfields and Agricultural Water Supplies
 24 April 1930 – 24 April 1933 (two ministers): Minister for Metropolitan Water Supply and Minister for Country Water Supplies
 24 April 1933 – 1 April 1947: Minister for Water Supplies
 1 April 1947 – 23 February 1953: Minister for Water Supply
 23 February 1953 – 5 March 1980: Minister for Water Supplies
 5 March 1980 – 23 September 2008: Minister for Water Resources
 23 September 2008 – present: Minister for Water

List of ministers

See also
 Minister for the Environment (Western Australia)
 Minister for Fisheries (Western Australia)
 Minister for Lands (Western Australia)

References
 David Black (2014), The Western Australian Parliamentary Handbook (Twenty-Third Edition). Perth [W.A.]: Parliament of Western Australia.

Water
Minister for Water